Emmaste was a rural municipality of the Estonian county of Hiiumaa, located at the south of the island.

Villages
Emmaste, Haldi, Haldreka, Harju, Härma, Hindu, Jausa, Kabuna, Kaderna, Kitsa, Kõmmusselja, Külaküla, Külama, Kurisu, Kuusiku, Laartsa, Lassi, Leisu, Lepiku, Metsalauka, Metsapere, Muda, Mänspe, Nurste, Ole, Prassi, Prähnu, Pärna, Rannaküla, Reheselja, Riidaküla, Selja, Sepaste, Sinima, Sõru, Tilga, Tohvri, Tärkma, Ulja, Valgu, Vanamõisa, Viiri, Õngu.

References

Former municipalities of Estonia